Tomislav Brkić and Ante Pavić were the defending champions but only Brkić chose to defend his title, partnering Alessandro Giannessi. Brkić withdrew in the first round due to medical reasons.

Ariel Behar and Andrey Golubev won the title after defeating Elliot Benchetrit and Hugo Gaston 6–4, 6–2 in the final.

Seeds

Draw

References

External links
 Main draw

Internazionali di Tennis Città di Todi - Doubles
2020 Doubles